Corbett and Courtney Before the Kinetograph (also known as Edison Kinetoscopic Record of Boxers and The Corbett-Courtney Fight) is an 1894 American short black-and-white silent film produced by William K.L. Dickson and starring James J. Corbett. It was only the second boxing match to be filmed following The Leonard-Cushing Fight which had been filmed by Dickson on June 14, 1894.

The films are listed as "1st Round," "2nd Round," "3rd Round," "4th Round," "5th Round," and "6th Round". Only one partial round of the original six rounds remains intact.

Plot
James J. Corbett (1866–1933) and Peter Courtney (1867–1896) both take part in a specially arranged boxing match under special conditions that allow for it to be filmed and displayed on a Kinetograph. The match consists of six one-minute rounds. James J. Corbett was a boxing hero of the time while Courtney was the underdog.

Production
The film was produced by the Edison Manufacturing Company, which had begun making films in 1890 under the direction of one of the earliest pioneers to film William K.L. Dickson. It was filmed entirely within the Black Maria studio at West Orange, New Jersey, in the USA, which is widely referred to as "America's First Movie Studio". It was filmed on September 7, 1894. Courtney died a little over a year after the film was made.

According to the Internet Movie Database the film was made in a 35 mm format with an aspect ratio of 1.33 : 1. The movie was intended to be displayed through means of a Kinetoscope.

Cast
 James J. Corbett as Boxer (Boxing hero of the time)
 Peter Courtney as Boxer (Underdog)

Current status 
The film's copyright has now expired and it is freely available on the internet to download. A copy is kept by the Library of Congress and can be viewed on their American Memory website. In 1997 it was featured in Sports on the Silver Screen, an anthology, narrated by Liev Schreiber, which looks at sports in cinema from the earliest silent films. It also included on disc one of the DVD Edison: The Invention of the Movies.

See also
 The Corbett-Fitzsimmons Fight, 1897 film

References

External links

 Library of Congress page with the film in various formats
 
 Corbett and Courtney Before the Kinetograph on YouTube
 

1894 films
American boxing films
American silent short films
American black-and-white films
Documentary films about boxing
Films directed by William Kennedy Dickson
Films shot in New Jersey
Thomas Edison
Edison Manufacturing Company films
1890s sports films
1890s short documentary films
American short documentary films
Articles containing video clips
1890s American films
Silent sports films